Buckeye is a city in Hardin County, Iowa, United States. The population was 86 at the time of the 2020 census.

History
Buckeye got its start circa 1901, following construction of the railroad through that territory.

Geography
Buckeye's longitude and latitude coordinatesin decimal form are 42.419473 -93.375829.

Demographics

2010 census
As of the census of 2010, there were 108 people, 44 households, and 29 families living in the city. The racial makeup of the city was 100.0% White.

There were 44 households, of which 27.3% had children under the age of 18 living with them, 45.5% were married couples living together, 11.4% had a female householder with no husband present, 9.1% had a male householder with no wife present, and 34.1% were non-families. 27.3% of all households were made up of individuals, and 9.1% had someone living alone who was 65 years of age or older. The average household size was 2.45 and the average family size was 2.86.

The median age in the city was 35 years. 24.1% of residents were under the age of 18; 12% were between the ages of 18 and 24; 25.9% were from 25 to 44; 26.9% were from 45 to 64; and 11.1% were 65 years of age or older. The gender makeup of the city was 57.4% male and 42.6% female.

2000 census
As of the census of 2000, there were 110 people, 45 households, and 27 families living in the city. The racial makeup of the city was 100.00% White.

There were 45 households, out of which 31.1% had children under the age of 18 living with them, 55.6% were married couples living together, 2.2% had a female householder with no husband present, and 40.0% were non-families. 35.6% of all households were made up of individuals, and 13.3% had someone living alone who was 65 years of age or older. The average household size was 2.44 and the average family size was 3.33.

In the city, the population was spread out, with 25.5% under the age of 18, 11.8% from 18 to 24, 30.0% from 25 to 44, 21.8% from 45 to 64, and 10.9% who were 65 years of age or older. The median age was 35 years. For every 100 females, there were 139.1 males. For every 100 females age 18 and over, there were 141.2 males.

The median income for a household in the city was $24,750, and the median income for a family was $32,500. Males had a median income of $22,375 versus $22,917 for females. The per capita income for the city was $16,880. There were 7.7% of families and 5.3% of the population living below the poverty line, including no under eighteens and 23.8% of those over 64.

Education
Alden Community School District operates public schools serving the community.

References

External links

 

Cities in Iowa
Cities in Hardin County, Iowa
1901 establishments in Iowa